Pierre-Yves is a given name. Notable people with the name include:

Pierre-Yves André (born 1974), retired French footballer
Pierre-Yves Barré (1749–1832), French vaudevillist and songwriter
Pierre-Yves Bény (born 1983), French gymnast
Pierre-Yves Borgeaud, Swiss film director
Pierre-Yves Bournazel (born 1977), French politician
Pierre-Yves Cardinal, Canadian film and television actor
Pierre Yves Clouin, video artist and filmmaker
Pierre-Yves Collombat (born 1945), member of the Senate of France
Pierre-Yves Corthals (born 1975), Belgian auto racing driver
Pierre-Yves Gerbeau (born 1965), French businessman, based in the United Kingdom
Pierre Yves Lenik (born 1958), French composer, known for his work in French documentaries
Pierre-Yves Maillard (born 1968), Swiss politician of the Social Democratic Party
Pierre-Yves Melançon, Canadian politician and a City Councillor in Montreal, Quebec
Pierre-Yves Monette (born 1960), the former secretary-general of EUREAU
Pierre-Yves Montagnat (born 1986), professional rugby union fullback or winger
Pierre-Yves Ngawa (born 1992), Belgian footballer
Pierre-Yves Oudeyer, Research Director at the French Institute for Research in Computer Science and Automation
Pierre-Yves Pelletier, graphic designer, who has designed 110 stamps for Canada Post
Pierre-Yves Plat (born 1980), French pianist who reinterprets classical masterpieces into jazz, ragtime, boogie, salsa and disco
Pierre-Yves Polomat (born 1993), Martinique-born French footballer
Pierre-Yves Roussel (born 1965), chairman and chief executive officer of LVMH Fashion Group
Pierre-Yves Trémois (born 1921), French visual artist and sculptor
Joseph Philipp Pierre Yves Elliott Trudeau (1919–2000), the 15th Prime Minister of Canada (1968 to 1979 and 1980 to 1984)

See also 

 Pierre
 Yves (given name)

Given names
French masculine given names